Aysu Keskin (born May 15, 1990 in İstanbul, Turkey) is a Turkish female basketball player. The young national plays for Fenerbahçe İstanbul as guard position. Aysu is 177 cm tall.

See also
 Turkish women in sports

References

1990 births
Living people
Turkish women's basketball players
Fenerbahçe women's basketball players
21st-century Turkish sportswomen